Manuel Arburúa de la Miyar (28 September 1902 – 17 December 1981) was a Spanish politician who served as Minister of Trade of Spain between 1951 and 1957, during the Francoist dictatorship.

References

1902 births
1981 deaths
Economy and finance ministers of Spain
Government ministers during the Francoist dictatorship